Valdo O. Williams (March 30, 1928 – July 8, 2010) was a Canadian post bop free jazz pianist best known for his trio work with Reggie Johnson and Stu Martin, who recorded together for the Savoy record label. He appeared on Canadian television with Charlie Parker in the 1950s and with Hal Singer in the 1960s.

Discography
New Advanced Jazz (Savoy, 1966)

References

1928 births
2010 deaths
Avant-garde jazz musicians
American jazz pianists
American male pianists
Post-bop jazz musicians
Savoy Records artists
20th-century American pianists
20th-century American male musicians
American male jazz musicians